WITB may refer to:

Working income tax benefit, a refundable tax credit for low-income working people in Canada
WITB-LP, a radio station licensed to Benton, Kentucky, USA